Maryam Begum was a Safavid princess, who was a daughter of shah Tahmasp I (r. 1524–1576) and in 1577 married the Kia'i ruler Khan Ahmad Khan—they later had an unnamed son and daughter named Yakhan Begum. Maryam Begum died in 1608/9.

Sources 
 
 
 
 

16th-century Iranian women
17th-century Iranian women
Safavid princesses
16th-century births
1609 deaths
16th-century people of Safavid Iran
17th-century people of Safavid Iran